Helen Thompson may refer to:
 Helen Thompson (political economist), English academic
 Helen F. Thompson, American businesswoman and politician
 Helen Harrod Thompson, co-creator of the Family Shelter for Victims of Domestic Violence
 Helen Taylor Thompson (1924–2020), co-founder of Europe's first AIDS hospice
 Helen Thompson (Doctors), a character on the TV series Doctors
 Helen Thompson Gaige (1890–1976), American herpetologist, born Helen Thompson
 Helen Cargill Thompson, Scottish scientist, librarian and art collector